North Carolina Highway 305 (NC 305) is a primary state highway in the U.S. state of North Carolina. NC 305 runs from US 13 north of Windsor to NC 186 in Seaboard. NC 305 is an original state highway and appeared on the 1936 official map of North Carolina from Seaboard to Aulander. NC 305 has an average of 1663 cars per day on the highway.

Route description
NC 305 begins at an intersection with US 13 north of Windsor, then heads northwesterly toward Burden and Connarlsta. The highway then crosses NC 11/NC 42 near Aulander and continues through downtown Aulander where it crosses the former route's business route. NC 305 then runs into southwestern Hertford County before it meets NC 561 near Northampton County. NC 305 and NC 561 run concurrently until Rich Square where it crosses US 258. Beyond US 258, NC 305 heads northwesterly toward Jackson and runs concurrently with US 158 westward into Jackson before it turns north towards Seaboard. After , NC 305 reaches its northern terminus at NC 186 in Seaboard.

History
 By 1930, NC 305 was extended north to its current terminus in Seaboard. By 1940, NC 305 was extended south to NC 97 north of Windsor. When US 13 was extended south, NC 97 was renumbered as part of US 13. NC 305 has had the same routing since then.

Junction list

See also

References

External links

 
 NC 305 at NCRoads.com

305
Transportation in Bertie County, North Carolina
Transportation in Hertford County, North Carolina
Transportation in Northampton County, North Carolina